Bar Beach may refer to:

 Bar Beach, Lagos, a former beach in Lagos
 Bar Beach  (New York), a beach in Port Washington on Long Island
 Bar Beach, New South Wales, a suburb of Newcastle